North Fork (formerly Brown's and Northfork; Mono  wa?ahhpY', "cedar grove") is a census-designated place (CDP) in Madera County, California, United States. As of the 2020 United States census it had a population of 3,250. It is part of the Madera Metropolitan Statistical Area.

The Northfork Rancheria of Mono Indians of California maintains their tribal headquarters in North Fork.

Geography
 
The community is drained by Willow Creek and by its North Fork and South Fork. Willow Creek is a south-flowing tributary of the San Joaquin River.

The geographic center or midpoint of the state of California is located between North Fork and Italian Bar. The point is about  driving distance from the United States Forest Service office in North Fork. The location is marked by a sign and a survey marker. NAD83 coordinates for the exact center of California are  The Fresno County line is less than one mile (1.6 km), (straight-line distance), from the site's survey marker. The actual site has wooden stairs leading up the hillside about 50 feet from the road. The marker is not wheelchair accessible.

Climate
North Fork has a Mediterranean climate (Köppen Cfa) with cool, rainy winters and hot, dry summers. Its hardiness zone is 7b.

History
The town's original inhabitants were members of the Mono tribe, who still constitute a significant portion of the population (9.4% according to the 2000 Census). The town was originally named "Brown's" after its first white settler, Milton Brown. The name "North Fork" came from the North Fork Lumber Company. The North Fork post office opened in 1888.

In the 1950s, it became a lumber town. North Fork's economy was based on the timber industry until the local lumber mill closed in 1996.

The US Forest Service Crane Valley Hotshots, an elite crew of wildland firefighters, are based in North Fork.

Points of interest
North Fork is home of the Sierra Mono Museum and the starting point of the Sierra Vista Scenic Byway. The town boasts two coffee shops, one grocery store, three restaurants (one of which is part of the town's bar) with another coming and one gas station.

Notable people
 Edmund Kemper, then 15 years old, shot his grandparents to death at a ranch in 1964
 Jeff King, four-time champion of the Iditarod Trail Sled Dog Race 
 Sam Peckinpah, director, spent much of his youth on his grandparents' ranch in North Fork

See also
Mission Fire

References

 "Center Of California" #608, California's Gold, Huell Howser Productions, 1995.

External links
 North Fork Chamber of Commerce
 Mono Indian museum in North Fork
 North Fork Community Development Council
 California's Gold (1991–2012) - Center of California (released August 6, 1995)

Census-designated places in California
Census-designated places in Madera County, California
Unincorporated communities in California
Unincorporated communities in Madera County, California